Yu-Mex (portmanteau of "Yugoslav" and "Mexican") was a style of popular music in the Socialist Federal Republic of Yugoslavia which incorporated the elements of traditional Mexican music. The style was mostly popular during the 1950s and 60s, when a string of Yugoslav singers began to perform traditional Mexican songs.

Yugoslavia did not have much of a film industry, and in the immediate post-war period, the majority of the films shown in Yugoslavia were from the Soviet Union. After the Tito–Stalin split of 1948, Soviet films were no longer shown in Yugoslavia. At the same time, Yugoslav president Josip Broz Tito did not want American films shown in Yugoslavia. As a result, he turned to importing Mexican films. The fact that many Mexican films glorified the Mexican Revolution, depicting ordinary Mexicans rising up against the oppressive Mexican state, made Mexican films "revolutionary" enough to be shown in Yugoslavia. Many parallels were drawn between the struggle waged by the Partisans in World War II and the Mexican Revolution. The first Mexican film to premiere was the 1950 drama Un día de vida (One day of life), which become a huge hit when it was shown in Yugoslavia in 1952. The plot of Un día de vida dealing with an execution of a rebel in the Mexican Revolution brought many audiences to tears in Yugoslavia, who saw an parallel with their own experiences of World War Two.

Other, more nonpolitical Mexican films, such as comedies and romances, also became popular, and it became common for many young Yugoslavs to imitate the styles of Mexican film stars, who were seen as embodying everything that was "cool". Because most of the films shown in Yugoslavia in the 1950s–1960s were Mexican, everything Mexican became very popular in Yugoslavia and many musicians started to don sombreros to perform Mexican music, either singing in Serbo-Croatian or in the original Spanish.

Literature and film 
Slovenian writer Miha Mazzini renewed the interest in Yu-Mex music after publishing his novel Paloma Negra. During the research for the novel, Mazzini recorded the stories told by protagonists and made a TV documentary Yugoslav Mexico (YuMex).

References

Articles

External links
YuMex or Yu-Mex: Mexican music in fifties Yugoslavia

Yugoslav music
Mexican folk songs
Mexican music